Domin may refer to:

 Domin of Veinne (died 536), French bishop and saint
 Friedrich Domin (1902-1961), German film actor
 Hilde Domin (1909-2006), pseudonym of Hilde Palm (née Löwenstein), German lyric poet and writer
 Jerónimo Domín Funes (1576-1650), Spanish Roman Catholic bishop
 Josip Franjo Domin (1754-1819), Croatian-Hungarian physicist, priest and physician
 Karel Domin (1882-1953), Czech botanist (standard author abbreviation Domin) and politician
 Domin Sport, a Polish cycling team founded in 2012

See also